Pierre Levasseur may refer to:

 Pierre Levasseur (aircraft builder) (1890–1941), French aircraft builder
 Pierre Émile Levasseur (1828–1911), French economist
 A colonial head of French Sénégal from September 1807 to 13 July 1809
 The protagonist of the 2006 French film The Valet

See also
 Levasseur (disambiguation)